The Niggerlovers was a 1967 play and featured the debut of Morgan Freeman; the original New York version starred Freeman and Stacy Keach.

Overview
A white professor lays his life on the line for social justice and is schooled by two African Americans, Freckles and Creampuff.

References

External links
Inside the Actors Studio

1967 plays
Drama
English-language plays